Dayworld Breakup is a 1990 science fiction novel by American writer Philip José Farmer, the last book in the Dayworld Trilogy.

Notes

See also
Philip José Farmer bibliography

1990 American novels
Dystopian novels
Overpopulation fiction
Novels by Philip José Farmer
1990 science fiction novels
Books with cover art by Don Ivan Punchatz